Hohendorf is a village and a former municipality in the Vorpommern-Greifswald district, in Mecklenburg-Vorpommern, Germany. It consists of the villages Schalense, Pritzier, Hohendorf and Zarnitz. Since 1 January 2012, it is part of the town Wolgast.

References

Former municipalities in Mecklenburg-Western Pomerania